Morrisville is a village in Madison County, New York, United States. The population was 2,199 at the 2010 census. The village is named after its founder, Thomas Morris.

The Village of Morrisville in the northwest part of the Town of Eaton on US Route 20. Its zip code is 13408. Morrisville State College is located in the village.

History
The community was named for Thomas Morris and was originally called "Morris Flats." It was made the county seat in 1817 when it was moved from Cazenovia. In 1907 the county seat was moved again this time to Wampsville.

In 1908, the New York State School of Agriculture was established and occupied the old county buildings that were left empty

The First National Bank of Morrisville, Morrisville Public Library, and Old Madison County Courthouse are listed on the National Register of Historic Places.

Geography
Morrisville is located at  (42.898541, -75.647717).

Demographics

As of the census of 2000, there were 2,148 people, 362 households, and 195 families residing in the village. The population density was 1,863.4 people per square mile (721.2/km2). There were 398 housing units at an average density of 345.3 per square mile (133.6/km2). The racial makeup of the village was 79.93% White, 14.20% African American, 0.74% Native American, 2.23% Asian, 0.93% from other races, and 1.96% from two or more races. Hispanic or Latino of any race were 4.24% of the population.

There were 362 households, out of which 27.1% had children under the age of 18 living with them, 41.7% were married couples living together, 10.8% had a female householder with no husband present, and 45.9% were non-families. 32.0% of all households were made up of individuals, and 10.5% had someone living alone who was 65 years of age or older. The average household size was 2.29 and the average family size was 2.92.

In the village, the population was spread out, with 9.0% under the age of 18, 60.8% from 18 to 24, 11.4% from 25 to 44, 8.3% from 45 to 64, and 10.6% who were 65 years of age or older. The median age was 20 years. For every 100 females, there were 108.1 males. For every 100 females age 18 and over, there were 107.3 males.

The median income for a household in the village was $34,375, and the median income for a family was $50,536. Males had a median income of $29,028 versus $24,643 for females. The per capita income for the village was $8,983. About 9.0% of families and 19.7% of the population were below the poverty line, including 27.2% of those under age 18 and 0.8% of those age 65 or over.

Education
The village is the location of SUNY Morrisville, which includes Morrisville fish hatchery, and the Morrisville Equestrian Center. Colgate University is eight miles to the southeast, Cazenovia College is 12 miles west, and Syracuse University is 30 miles northwest.

Popular culture
In the 1980s cartoon series, The Real Ghostbusters, Morrisville was the hometown of Ray Stantz.

References

External links
 Morrisville area brief history

Villages in New York (state)
Syracuse metropolitan area
Villages in Madison County, New York